Phlegmacium prasinocyaneum is a species of mushroom producing fungus in the family Cortinariaceae.

Taxonomy 
It was described in 1939 by the mycologist Robert Henry who classified it as Cortinarius prasinocyaneus.

In 2022 the species was transferred from Cortinarius and reclassified as Phlegmacium prasinocyaneum based on genomic data.

Habitat and distribution 
It is found in Western Europe and Scandinavia. It is endangered.

See also
List of Cortinarius species

References

External links

prasinocyaneus
Fungi of Europe
Fungi described in 1939